The USL First Division (usually referred to as USL-1) was a professional men's soccer league in the United States and Canada from 2005 to 2010.

During its existence, it formed the second tier of soccer in the United States soccer league system behind Major League Soccer. It was operated by United Soccer Leagues (USL) and was known as the A-League, from 1997 until 2004.

Several teams left the league in 2009 to form the new North American Soccer League, with the intent of running their own second-tier league. Following a brief legal dispute, the two leagues operated in tandem under United States Soccer Federation (USSF) mediation as the USSF Division 2 Professional League in 2010 before the split became final. The teams that remained in the First Division were merged with the USL Second Division in 2011 to form USL Pro.

History 

When the A-League became the USL First Division in 2005, the league comprised 12 teams: Atlanta Silverbacks, Charleston Battery, Minnesota Thunder, Montreal Impact, Portland Timbers, Puerto Rico Islanders, Richmond Kickers, Rochester Raging Rhinos, Seattle Sounders, Toronto Lynx, Vancouver Whitecaps, and Virginia Beach Mariners. The Calgary Mustangs, Edmonton Aviators, and Syracuse Salty Dogs, all of whom competed in the final A-League season in 2004, folded during the offseason, and did not take up their places in the new league.

The Seattle Sounders won the inaugural USL1 championship, beating Richard on penalty kicks in the championship game after a 1–1 tie in regulation time. The Vancouver Whitecaps won the first of their two USL1 titles in 2006 by beating the Rochester Raging Rhinos 3–0 in the championship game, while Seattle won their second title in 2007 by overcoming the Atlanta Silverbacks in a one-sided 4–0 final. Vancouver won their second USL1 championship in 2008 by beating the Puerto Rico Islanders 2–1 in the first USL1 final to feature no American teams; the championship went north of the border again in 2009 when Montreal Impact won their first USL1 title, beating Vancouver 6–3 on aggregate over two legs in the first all-Canadian affair.

On August 27, 2009, Nike agreed to sell its stake in the United Soccer Leagues (USL) to Rob Hoskins and Alec Papadakis of Atlanta-based NuRock Soccer Holdings, instead of to the USL Team Owner's Association (TOA), a group comprising the owners of several USL First Division clubs. In the months that followed, several prominent TOA members began to voice their concerns about the state of the league in general, its management structure and ownership model, the leadership of USL president Francisco Marcos, and about the sale of the league to NuRock, which the TOA felt was counter-productive and detrimental to the development of the league. Within several weeks, a number of TOA member clubs threatened to break away from USL and start their own league; this break away became official on November 10, 2009, when the majority of USL-1 clubs, as well as one of the expected 2010 expansion franchises, applied to the United States Soccer Federation, the Canadian Soccer Association, and FIFA for approval to create a new North American Soccer League, reducing the league's membership to just three teams.

After lawsuits were filed and heated press statements exchanged, the United States Soccer Federation (USSF) declared they would sanction neither the NASL nor the USL First Division in 2010, and ordered both "camps" to work together on a plan to temporarily allow their teams to play a 2010 season. The interim solution was announced on January 7, 2010, with the USSF running the new USSF D2 Pro League comprising clubs from both USL-1 and NASL. All 12 teams from the USL First Division and the NASL competed in the USSF D2 Pro League in 2010, which was won by the Puerto Rico Islanders.

On September 8, 2010, the USL announced the formation of USL Pro which would merge the USL First Division and USL Second Division to begin play in 2011. The merger is meant to consolidate USL's position within the American professional soccer landscape and focus on commercial growth and professional development of soccer in 4 main regions throughout the U.S., Canada, and the Caribbean. The First Division was formally dissolved following the completion of the temporary season to make way for USL Pro.

Expansion and contraction 
Prior to 2010, the league had a steady rate of expansion and contraction. Richmond was voluntarily relegated to the USL Second Division in 2006 to cut costs, Toronto was voluntarily relegated to the USL Premier Development League in 2007 because of MLS expansion, and on March 30, 2007, the Virginia Beach Mariners folded just prior to the start of the 2007 season due to an ownership dispute which left the team without financing. These teams were replaced by two new teams: the Carolina RailHawks from the Triangle region of North Carolina, playing out of Cary, and California Victory, a team in Northern California under the ownership of Dmitry Piterman (chairman of Spanish team Deportivo Alavés) which folded after the end of the 2007 season, having played only one season.

In November 2008, the Atlanta Silverbacks announced that they would sit out the 2009 season to "reassess the landscape," and would possibly return at a future date.
Similarly, the Seattle Sounders left prior to the 2009 season due to the imminent entrance of Seattle Sounders FC into Major League Soccer. Their spot in the league was taken by the Cleveland City Stars, who won the USL Second Division title in 2008, and voluntarily moved up to USL-1 for the 2009 season, folded at the end of the year. On December 2, 2009, Inside Minnesota Soccer reported that the USL had asked the City Stars to terminate the contracts of all the players, as the franchise was to be dissolved. Posting an email addressed to all players under contract with the Cleveland City Stars and written by team president Jonathan Ortlip and executive director Aaron Tredway, the club executives went on to accept the decision to terminate the franchise.

On June 19, 2008, an announcement was made that an expansion slot had been awarded to a Tampa Bay, Florida-based franchise led by main investors Andrew Nestor (CEO) and Hinds Howard (chairman) of Citrus Ventures. The plan was for the club to join the league in 2010 and be named the Tampa Bay Rowdies.

Expansion rumors 
Possible cities mentioned for future campaigns included Fort Lauderdale, Florida and Syracuse, New York. Syracuse had had a highly attended team in the A-League from 2002 to 2004, but it folded due to stadium issues, having ground-shared with the local baseball team. Fort Lauderdale also had a history of teams from the NASL, American Soccer League, and USL First Division. There was also discussion that Argentinian team River Plate is interested in putting a second USL team in Puerto Rico, as well as discussion that recent start-up team, the San Diego Flash may also join either the USL or NASL.

Prior to the 2009 NASL split several other cities had been mentioned as being locations where future USL-1 franchises might launch, including St. Louis, Missouri (led by the current USL Premier Development League (PDL) franchise St. Louis Lions); Orlando, Florida (with Mexican side Pachuca being rumored as connected to it); Milwaukee, Wisconsin; Detroit, Michigan; Hamilton, Ontario; San Antonio, Texas; and Ottawa, Ontario. On September 1, 2009, a group from Ottawa formally applied for USL-1 team, contingent on the approval of updates to Lansdowne Park. The team would share a field with the Ottawa Redblacks football team. The Ottawa group subsequently committed to the NASL.

Structure 
Unlike most other nations, there is no system of merit-based promotion and relegation in the American and Canadian pyramids, meaning that the champions of USL-1 could not move up to Major League Soccer and, similarly, the worst teams in MLS were not in danger of being demoted to USL-1. However, some USL-1 teams had in the past chosen to take voluntary relegation to a lower level of the USL system, often to reduce operating costs, while teams had also decided to move up to USL-1 after finding success at the lower levels.

Playoff format 
The top seven teams advanced to the playoff tournament, with the Commissioner's Cup winner (regular season champion) receiving a bye into the semi-finals. Each round consisted of two legs, the lower seeded team hosting the first leg, and the higher seed hosting the second. Prior to 2009, the final was played as a single leg at the higher seed's stadium. After the first legs were completed, the lowest remaining seed played the Commissioner's Cup winner, and the higher seeds played each other. The highest remaining seed hosted the penultimate game of the Finals. The playoffs started the week after the completion of the regular season, and typically ended in mid-October.

Teams 
 Atlanta Silverbacks (2005–08)
 Austin Aztex (2008–09) (2010 season played in USSF D2 Pro League)
 California Victory (2007)
 Carolina RailHawks (2007–09) (2010 season played in USSF D2 Pro League for NASL Conference)
 Charleston Battery (2005–09)
 Cleveland City Stars (2009)
 FC Tampa Bay (2010) (2010 season played in USSF D2 Pro League)
 Miami FC (2006–09) (2010 season played in USSF D2 Pro League for NASL Conference)
 Minnesota Thunder (2005–09)
 Montreal Impact (2005–09) (2010 season played in USSF D2 Pro League for NASL Conference)
 Portland Timbers (2005–10) (2010 season played in USSF D2 Pro League)
 Puerto Rico Islanders (2005–10) (2010 season played in USSF D2 Pro League)
 Richmond Kickers (2005)
 Rochester Rhinos (2005–10) (2010 season played in USSF D2 Pro League)
 Seattle Sounders (2005–08)
 Toronto Lynx (2005–06)
 Vancouver Whitecaps (2005–09) (2010 season played in USSF D2 Pro League for NASL Conference)
 Virginia Beach Mariners (2005–06)

†The Austin Aztex have been awarded a USL Pro franchise and will begin play in 2015 in that league.

 
   
   
   
   
   
   
  

 See also A-League

League champions / top goal scorer

Regular season champions (Commissioner’s Cup winners)

Most successful clubs

League average attendance

All-time USL leaders 

Note: includes stats from the old A-League

See also 
 Sports attendances

Notes 
 (*) Puerto Rico can qualify for the CFU Club Championship via a domestic cup competition.

References

External links 
 Official site (archived)
 Unofficial fan site

 
Fir
Defunct soccer leagues in the United States
Defunct soccer leagues in Canada